Terry Peak is a mountain and ski area in the west central United States, in the Black Hills of South Dakota outside of Lead.

The mountain was named for Alfred Howe Terry, who had explored the area. It was first used as a ski area in 1936 by the Bald Mountain Ski Club when a rope tow was installed. The first chair lift was installed in 1952 and began operation in 1954. The ski area has since seen many upgrades in chair lifts, trails, and accommodations.

Currently, there are three "high speed" chairlifts (Kussy, Surprise, and Gold Corp Express, (or Blue, Yellow, and Red, respectively), which provide access to most of the runs on the mountain in a matter of minutes, as well as one traditional-speed lift (Stewart, or "Green"), and a Sno-Carpet.  

Terry Peak hosted the NCAA Skiing Championships in 1971. Several radio stations have transmitter towers at the summit.

Ski area description
30 runs
4 lifts (Black lift was removed and replaced by Sno-Carpet)
Terrain park
Snowmaking
Ski and snowboard rental

See also
 Black Hills
 List of mountains in South Dakota

References

External links

Black Hills
Buildings and structures in Lawrence County, South Dakota
Mountains of South Dakota
Ski areas and resorts in South Dakota
1936 establishments in South Dakota
Tourist attractions in Lawrence County, South Dakota
Landforms of Lawrence County, South Dakota